Setaria megaphylla, the broad-leaved bristle grass, big-leaf bristle grass, ribbon bristle grass, or bigleaf bristlegrass, is native to south-eastern Africa. It is also cultivated, and it has naturalized outside its native range, for example, in Florida in the United States.

It may be found in glades in forested areas and along rivers or streams. It can grow to more than 2 metres tall and has broad dark green leaves and hairy leaf sheaths. Many kinds of birds, such as finches and canaries, eat the seeds.

References

megaphylla
Grasses of Africa
Flora of East Tropical Africa
Flora of South Tropical Africa
Flora of Southern Africa
Flora of West Tropical Africa
Flora of West-Central Tropical Africa
Grasses of South Africa